San Ching Tian Temple (also called as Lian Hua San Chieng Tien) is a Chinese temple located in a 1.5-acre site bordered by housing area in Krokop 9 Road of Miri, Sarawak, Malaysia, where it is also considered as the largest Taoist temple in Southeast Asia.

History 
The temple was built in 2000 and completed after three years with its entire decorations and motif including the dragon and its Three Pure Ones statues were imported from China.

References

External links 
 

Chinese-Malaysian culture
Taoist temples in Malaysia
Religious buildings and structures completed in 2003
Buildings and structures in Kuching
Tourist attractions in Sarawak